Marie Edmonds (born 14 September 1975) is a Professor of volcanology and geology in the Department of Earth Sciences at the University of Cambridge whose research focuses on the physics and chemistry of volcanic eruptions and magmatism and understanding volatile cycling in the solid Earth as mediated by plate tectonics. She is interested in the social and economic impacts of natural hazards; and the sustainable use of Earth's mineral and energy resources.  Professor Edmonds is the Vice President and Ron Oxburgh Fellow in Earth Sciences at Queens' College, Cambridge; and the Deputy Head of Department and Director of Research at the Earth Sciences Department, University of Cambridge.

Education 
Edmonds was born in Plymouth, Devon on 14 September 1975. She was educated at Plymouth High School for Girls, Plymouth, Devon (1987-1994). She obtained a BA Honours degree (a double first) in Natural Sciences at the University of Cambridge in 1997, specialising in Geological Sciences. She began her PhD studies the same year at Cambridge, under Professors David Pyle and Clive Oppenheimer. Her thesis was entitled 'Sulfur and chlorine emissions from the Soufriere Hills Volcano, Montserrat' and she graduated with the PhD degree in 2002.

Career 
After receiving her PhD she served as a volcanologist for the British Geological Survey at its Montserrat Volcano Observatory. From 2004 to 2006 Edmonds was a Mendenhall Fellow with the US Geological Survey at its Hawaiian Volcano Observatory. From 2006 to 2006 she was reader at the University of East Anglia School of Environmental Sciences. She is now a Fellow of Queens' College (since 2007) and a professor at the University of Cambridge, where she teaches igneous petrology, geochemistry, and volcanology.

Edmonds has held a number of leadership roles within the Natural Environment Research Council of the UK and the Geological Society of London. Edmonds served on the Deep Carbon Observatory's (DCO) executive committee,  chaired the Synthesis Group 2019. Edmonds is also the co-Chair of DCO's Reservoirs and Fluxes Directorate of DCO. Edmonds served as Secretary for Science 2014–2018 at the Geological Society of London and was the Volcanology, Petrology Secretary of the American Geophysical Union 2016–2018. Edmonds is a principal editor of the AGU journal Geochemistry, Geophysics, Geosystems (G-Cubed).

Honours and awards 
In 2022 Edmonds was elected Geochemistry Fellow of the Geochemical Society and European Association of Geochemistry; and in 2021 a Member of the Academia Europaea. She was an AGU College of Fellows Distinguished Lecturer in 2021-2022. In 2021 she received the Bigsby Medal of the Geological Society of London 'for eminent services in the field of geology'.  In 2020 Edmonds was one of three recipients of the Joanne Simpson Medal of the American Geophysical Union, its premier mid-career award, which comes with conferred Fellowship of the American Geophysical Union. Edmonds received the ThermoFisher VMSG annual Award in 2019. In 2019 she gave Daly Lecture of the American Geophysical Union. In 2017 she received the Wager Medal of the International Association of Volcanology and Chemistry of the Earth's Interior. In 2014, Edmonds received the William Smith Fund of the Geological Society of London.

Selected publications

References 

Living people
British geologists
Alumni of the University of Cambridge
Academics of the University of Cambridge
Fellows of Queens' College, Cambridge
1975 births